Godfrey Macdonald may refer to:
 Godfrey Macdonald, 3rd Baron Macdonald of Slate (1775–1832)
 Godfrey Macdonald, 8th Baron Macdonald (born 1947)